Flight 802 may refer to

British Eagle International Airlines Flight 802, crashed on 29 February 1964
World Airways Flight 802, crashed on 8 September 1973

0802